Body and Soul is a 1999 American sports drama film directed by Sam Henry Kass and starring Rod Steiger, Jennifer Beals, Michael Chiklis, Tahnee Welch, Ray Mancini, and Joe Mantegna.  It is a remake of the 1947 film of the same name.

Plot
Dreaming of making it as a professional, ambitious small-town boxer Charlie Davis (Ray Mancini) travels to Reno, Nevada with his unwavering friend Tiny O'Toole (Michael Chiklis). However, during his ascent to the top, he loses himself and forsakes the people he cares for most.

Cast
 Ray Mancini as Charlie Davis
 Michael Chiklis as 'Tiny' O'Toole
 Jennifer Beals as Gina
 Rod Steiger as Johnny Ticotin
 Joe Mantegna as Alex Dumas
 Tahnee Welch as Felice Gillian

See also
Body and Soul (1947 film)
Body and Soul (1981 film)

References

External links
 
 

American boxing films
1990s English-language films
1999 films
Metro-Goldwyn-Mayer films
American sports drama films
Remakes of American films
1990s sports drama films
1990s American films